The 2020 Qatar Women's T20I Triangular Series was a women's Twenty20 International (WT20I) cricket tournament that took place at the West End Park International Cricket Stadium in Doha, Qatar from 17 to 21 January 2020. Matches in the series had official WT20I games as per ICC's announcement that full WT20I status would apply to all the matches played between women's teams of associate members after 1 July 2018. Qatar and Oman both made their WT20I debut in the opening match the tournament.

The participants were originally announced to be the women's national sides of Qatar, China, Kuwait and Oman, playing in a quadrangular round-robin event followed by semi-finals and a final. However, on the first day of the event, the tournament was changed to a triangular series with China withdrawn at short notice and a new schedule was announced.

Oman booked their place in the final on day two and were joined by Kuwait the following day. Kuwait recovered from losing to Oman in the last round-robin match by defeating the same opponents in the final by a comfortable margin of 7 wickets.

Squads

Round-robin

Points table

Matches

Final

References

External links
 Series home at ESPN Cricinfo

Associate international cricket competitions in 2019–20
Twenty20 International cricket competitions